Medelsheim is a German village, part of the municipality of Gersheim, in the Saarpfalz-Kreis, Saarland.

Geography 
Medelsheim is in the Parr countryside. In the south, the municipal border is the state border with France. To the east is the German state of Rheinland Pfalz.

Politics 
The districts of Medelsheim and Seyweiler together form a municipality. Of the nine seats in the local council, all belong to the CDU. (2019)

History 
Archeological finds in Medelsheim span the period from the early Bronze Age through the Gallo-Roman period.  The earliest written mention of the village of "Medilinesheim" is found in a June 28, 888 charter of the East Frankish King Arnulf.

During World War II Medelsheim was briefly occupied at the beginning of the war by French troops during the September 1939 Saar Offensive. It was reoccupied by German troops the next month.

In 1995 Medelsheim was awarded a gold medal in the nationwide competition "Unser Dorf soll schöner werden" (Roughly: "Most Beautiful Village"). Literally translates to "our village should become more beautiful"

Culture 
As the center of the traditional Catholic area of the Parr, Medelsheim has many crossroads in its field, which are connected to each other by a hiking trail.

The Church of St. Martin is based on Roman foundations. It contains Gothic wall paintings and a Gothic retable from around 1430, which was found in 1956.The Kreuzkapelle to the Sorrowful Mother on the Husarenberg was formerly a pilgrimage chapel. It dates from 1767 and contains a Pietà from 1554.

At the suggestion of Michael von Faulhaber, Bishop of Speyer, the Way of the Cross was laid out in 1920, the 14 stations of which depict scenes from the Passion of Christ [4]. The Way of the Cross leads up to the Husarenberg. The individual stations are worked into simple white pillars with gable roofs as folk-art half-reliefs.

Traditionally, the Jakobsmarkt, which has existed for centuries, takes place on the second Sunday in July, where historical handicrafts are presented in addition to the hustle and bustle of the fair.

People 
As of 2013 Medelsheim has a population of approximately 480.

 Jewish Cerf Beer family (See Medelsheim (surname))

References

External links 
 Medelsheim page of Gersheim website

Villages in Saarland
Former municipalities in Saarland
Historic Jewish communities